The 1990 U.S. Men's Clay Court Championships was an Association of Tennis Professionals men's tennis tournament held in Kiawah Island, South Carolina in the United States. It was the 22nd edition of the tournament and was held from May 7 to May 14, 1990. Third-seeded David Wheaton won the singles title.

Finals

Singles

 David Wheaton defeated  Mark Kaplan 6–4, 6–4
 It was Wheaton's 1st title of the year and the 1st of his career.

Doubles

 Scott Davis /  David Pate defeated  Jim Grabb /  Leonardo Lavalle 6–2, 6–3
 It was Davis's 3rd title of the year and the 15th of his career. It was Pate's 2nd title of the year and the 13th of his career.

References

External links 
 Association of Tennis Professionals (ATP) Tournament Profile

 
U.S. Men's Clay Court Championships
U.S. Men's Clay Court Championships
U.S. Men's Clay Court Championships
U.S. Men's Clay Court Championships